William Kruppinger was an American gymnast. He competed in three events at the 1904 Summer Olympics.

References

External links
 

Year of birth missing
Year of death missing
American male artistic gymnasts
Olympic gymnasts of the United States
Gymnasts at the 1904 Summer Olympics
Place of birth missing